Peter Shapiro may refer to:

Peter Shapiro (journalist), British music journalist 
Peter Shapiro (financier) (born 1952), New Jersey financial executive and former politician
Peter Shapiro (concert promoter), American concert promoter and publisher
Peter Shapiro, American musician, former member of The Marbles and The Loading Zone